Lieutenant-Colonel John Frederick MacKay  (6 June 1873 – 9 January 1930) was a Scottish recipient of the Victoria Cross, the highest and most prestigious award for gallantry in the face of the enemy that can be awarded to British and Commonwealth forces.

Details

He was 26 years old, and a lance-corporal in the 1st Battalion, The Gordon Highlanders, British Army during the Second Boer War when the following deed took place at Crow's Nest Hill, Johannesburg, for which he was awarded the VC.

His Victoria Cross is displayed at the Gordon Highlanders Museum, Aberdeen, Scotland along with his other medals.

Further service
Mackay was commissioned into the King's Own Scottish Borderers as a second lieutenant on 27 July 1901, while still in South Africa. Following the end of the Second Boer War in June 1902, he left Durban for England on the SS Nubia in August 1902. One year later, he was promoted to acting lieutenant while serving with the West African Frontier Force (WAFF). This rank was confirmed in 1905. He transferred to the Hampshire Regiment as a captain in 1907 and to the Argyll and Sutherland Highlanders in 1908, still attached to the WAFF. He served with the Argylls for the rest of his career, although attached to other regiments. From November 1908 to 1912 he served as adjutant of the 7th (Volunteer) Battalion, Royal Scots. In November 1914 he became adjutant of the Indian Volunteers, but later moved to the 21st Battalion, Northumberland Fusiliers (2nd Tyneside Scottish). In 1915 he was promoted Major. In August 1916 he was promoted Lieutenant-Colonel commanding a battalion of the Highland Light Infantry. He retired in 1921.

References

Monuments to Courage (David Harvey, 1999)
The Register of the Victoria Cross (This England, 1997)
Scotland's Forgotten Valour (Graham Ross, 1995)
Victoria Crosses of the Anglo-Boer War (Ian Uys, 2000)

External links
 angloboerwar.com
 Tyneside Scottish

1873 births
1930 deaths
Second Boer War recipients of the Victoria Cross
Gordon Highlanders soldiers
King's Own Scottish Borderers officers
Royal Hampshire Regiment officers
Argyll and Sutherland Highlanders officers
Royal West African Frontier Force officers
British Army personnel of World War I
British military personnel of the Tirah campaign
British Army personnel of the Second Boer War
Military personnel from Edinburgh
British Army recipients of the Victoria Cross